Canada Customs and Revenue Agency (CCRA; , ADRC) was a department of the government of Canada and existed from November 1, 1999 until December 12, 2003. It was created from the merging of Revenue Canada with Canada Customs.

The CCRA was subsequently split into the Canada Border Services Agency and Canada Revenue Agency.

During the 1976 Summer Olympics in Montreal, QC, the department was called the Department of National Revenue Customs and Excise.

References

1999 establishments in Canada
2003 disestablishments in Canada
Customs services
Former Canadian federal departments and agencies
Canadian taxation government bodies
Corporate taxation in Canada